Mae West is a sculpture in Munich-Bogenhausen designed by Rita McBride. Named after the actress, the plastic artwork is a  52 meter high hyperboloid of one sheet built from carbon fiber reinforced polymer.

Mae West was planned in 2002 for the newly available Effnerplatz after construction of a tunnel. Following highly controversial discussions about size, shape and cost both within the city council and among the citizens, the sculpture was built between October 2010 and January 2011. Since December 2011, the Munich tram drives through it.

Location 

The sculpture stands on top of the Effnertunnel, a tunnel constructed for the Mittlerer Ring. East of it, the Arabellapark with its skyscrapers is located. Nearby multiple stops of the Munich Tram and Bus system are located. Trains of the Munich Tram are going through the sculpture.

History

Idea, planning and development 
In 2002, due to the planning of the Effnertunnel, the newly available square was selected as the side of a new art project and eight artists were asked to develop ideas for this area. In the end, Rita McBride's idea won against drafts by, among others, Thomas Schütte and Dennis Oppenheim.

Due to the size of 52 m (171 ft) (previously 60 m) and the projected costs of € 1.5m, the sculpture was highly controversial. Munich mayor Christian Ude was the most prominent critic, comparing the sculpture to an egg cup. After heated discussions, Munich's city council voted 40–35 to build the sculpture, with the co-ruling Alliance 90/The Greens party joining the opposition parties to vote for the sculpture.

Construction

References 

2011 establishments in Germany
2011 sculptures
Buildings and structures in Munich
Cultural depictions of Mae West
Hyperboloid structures
Outdoor sculptures in Germany